Tetrix may refer to:

 Tetrix (band), a Canadian rock/improv band
 Tetrix (insect), a genus of insects in the family Tetrigidae called ground-hoppers
 Tetrix Robotics Kit, an educational robotics kit
 8598 Tetrix, a main-belt asteroid
 A three-dimensional analog of the Sierpiński triangle.
 The name of some clones of the video game Tetris.